Amnaj Kaewkiew is a retired professional footballer from Thailand. He plays for Bangkok Glass in the Thailand Premier League from 1996 to 2014. He captained the side in the Asian Champions League in 2008 He is current first-team coach of Thai League 1 club BG Pathum United.

He played for Krung Thai Bank F.C. in the 2008 AFC Champions League group stages.

Honours
Krung Thai Bank 
 Thailand Premier League: Champion (2): 2003, 2004
 Queen's Cup: Runner-up (1): 2006

Bangkok Glass
Singapore Cup Winner (1): 2010
 Runner-up (1): 2009
Thai FA Cup Runner-up (1): 2013
Queen's Cup Winner (1): 2010
Thai Super Cup Runner-up (1): 2009

References

1975 births
Living people
Amnaj Kaewkiew
Amnaj Kaewkiew
Amnaj Kaewkiew
Amnaj Kaewkiew
Association football defenders